Kharkiv Television Tower, most commonly known as the Kharkiv TV Tower, is a  tall steel truss television tower for FM-/TV-broadcasting in Kharkiv, Ukraine. It is of similar design of Kyiv TV Tower, but has legs of a closed metal structure. In addition, the tower was constructed with truss-like space frames, which are lightweight rigid structures constructed from/by interlocking and/or intertwining struts in a geometric pattern.

See also 

List of tallest towers in the world
Kharkiv

References

External links 

Towers in Ukraine
Towers completed in 1981
Buildings and structures in Kharkiv